The Turquino collared sphaero (Sphaerodactylus cricoderus) is a species of lizard in the family Sphaerodactylidae. The species is endemic to Cuba.

References

Sphaerodactylus
Reptiles of Cuba
Endemic fauna of Cuba
Reptiles described in 1992
Taxa named by Stephen Blair Hedges